The 2012 Colonial Square Ladies Classic was held from November 8 to 12 at the Nutana Curling Club in Saskatoon, Saskatchewan. It was the third women's Grand Slam event of the 2012–13 World Curling Tour. The event was held in a triple knockout format with 48 teams, and the purse for the event was CAD$54,000. Lawton won her second Grand Slam and sixth Colonial Square Ladies Classic title with a win over Chelsea Carey in the final, stealing the winning point in the final end and winning with a score of 5–4.

Teams
The teams are listed as follows:

Knockout Draw Brackets
The draw is listed as follows:

A event

B event

C event

Knockout results
All draw times listed in Central Standard Time.

Note that in Draws 2 through 12, draw times are staggered so that the second half of the draw's games begin one hour after the first half of the draw's games.

Draw 1
Thursday, November 8, 8:00 pm

Draw 2
Friday, November 9, 7:30 am

Friday, November 9, 8:30 am

Draw 3
Friday, November 9, 10:00 am

Friday, November 9, 11:00 am

Draw 4
Friday, November 9, 12:30 pm

Friday, November 9, 1:30 pm

Draw 5
Friday, November 9, 3:30 pm

Friday, November 9, 4:30 pm

Draw 6
Friday, November 9, 6:00 pm

Friday, November 9, 7:00 pm

Draw 7
Friday, November 9, 8:30 pm

Friday, November 9, 9:30 pm

Draw 8
Saturday, November 10, 9:00 am

Saturday, November 10, 10:00 am

Draw 9
Saturday, November 10, 11:30 am

Saturday, November 10, 12:30 pm

Draw 10
Saturday, November 10, 2:00 pm

Saturday, November 10, 3:00 pm

Draw 11
Saturday, November 10, 5:00 pm

Saturday, November 10, 6:00 pm

Draw 12
Saturday, November 10, 7:30 pm

Saturday, November 10, 8:30 pm

Draw 13
Sunday, November 11, 10:00 am

Draw 14
Sunday, November 11, 1:00 pm

Draw 15
Sunday, November 11, 4:00 pm

Draw 16
Sunday, November 11, 7:00 pm

Playoffs
The playoffs draw is listed as follows:

Round of 16
Monday, November 12, 9:00 am

Quarterfinals
Monday, November 12, 12:30 pm

Semifinals
Monday, November 12, 4:00 pm

Final
Monday, November 12, 7:30 pm

References

External links

Results from saskcurl.com

Colonial Square Ladies Classic
Colonial Square Ladies Classic
Curling in Saskatoon